Terlingua Creek is a stream in the U.S. state of Texas. It is a tributary of the Rio Grande.

See also
 List of rivers of Texas
 List of tributaries of the Rio Grande

References

Tributaries of the Rio Grande
Rivers of Texas
Bodies of water of Brewster County, Texas